The 1918 Ross by-election was held on 4 May 1918.  The by-election was held due to the incumbent Conservative MP, Percy Clive, being killed in action  in the First World War.  It was won by the Conservative candidate Charles Pulley.

References

1918 in England
Ross-on-Wye
1918 elections in the United Kingdom
By-elections to the Parliament of the United Kingdom in Herefordshire constituencies
20th century in Herefordshire